Getting Off may refer to:

 "Getting Off" (CSI), a fourth-season episode of television series CSI: Crime Scene Investigation
 "Getting Off", a song by Korn from See You on the Other Side

See also 
 Get Off (disambiguation)
 "Gett Off", a 1991 song by Prince
 "Get It Off", a song by American hip hop singer Monica from her 2003 album After the Storm